The Hesketh 308D is a Formula One racing car built by the Hesketh Racing team in 1976. The car was based on the Hesketh 308 originally designed by Harvey Postlethwaite, and was  powered by a 3-litre V8 Ford Cosworth DFV engine.

Anthony 'Bubbles' Horsley updated the 308 to the 308D to continue as Hesketh Racing after Postlethwaite moved to Walter Wolf Racing. Nigel Stroud was team chief engineer and  Harald Ertl was signed to drive the 308D for the 1976 season, with the team being sponsored by Penthouse Magazine and Rizla. Guy Edwards joined in a second 308D car from the Belgian Grand Prix, and Alex Ribeiro brought in some funds later in the year. The team scored no World Championship points in 1976, with Ertl's 7th place at the British Grand Prix being the team's best result of the year.

Complete Formula One World Championship results
(key) 

Hesketh Formula One cars